The 2015 World Mountain Running Championships was the 31st edition of the global mountain running competition, World Mountain Running Championships, organised by the World Mountain Running Association and was held in Betws-y-Coed, United Kingdom on 19 September 2015.

Results

References

External links
 World Mountain Running Association official web site

World Mountain Running Championships
World Long Distance Mountain Running